William B. Shubb (born May 28, 1938) is a senior United States district judge of the United States District Court for the Eastern District of California.

Early life and education
Born in Oakland, California, Shubb received a Bachelor of Arts degree from the University of California, Berkeley in 1960 and a Juris Doctor from the University of California, Berkeley, Boalt Hall School of Law in 1963.

Career
Shubb was a law clerk for Judge Sherrill Halbert of the United States District Court for the Eastern District of California from 1963 to 1965. He served as an Assistant United States Attorney of the Eastern District of California from 1965 to 1971. He was the Chief Assistant United States Attorney of Eastern District of California from 1971 to 1974. From 1974 to 1980 and 1981 to 1990, he was in private practice in Sacramento, California. Shubb was the United States Attorney for the Eastern District of California from 1980 to 1981.

Federal judicial service
On August 3, 1990, Shubb was nominated by President George H. W. Bush to a seat on the United States District Court for the Eastern District of California vacated by Judge Raul Anthony Ramirez. Shubb was confirmed by the United States Senate on September 28, 1990, and received his commission on October 1, 1990. He served as Chief Judge from 1996 to 2003, assuming senior status on November 1, 2004.

References

Sources

1938 births
Living people
Assistant United States Attorneys
Judges of the United States District Court for the Eastern District of California
United States Attorneys for the Eastern District of California
United States district court judges appointed by George H. W. Bush
20th-century American judges
UC Berkeley School of Law alumni
21st-century American judges